Hollie Jade Armitage (born 14 June 1997) is an English cricketer who currently captains Yorkshire and Northern Diamonds, as well as playing for Northern Superchargers. An all-rounder, she plays as a right-handed batter and right-arm leg break bowler. She has previously played for Yorkshire Diamonds, Sydney Sixers and Tasmania.

Early life
Armitage was born on 14 June 1997 in Huddersfield, West Yorkshire.

Domestic career
Armitage made her county debut in 2013, for Yorkshire against Surrey, scoring 25 runs and taking 3/2 from 1.4 overs in a 12-run victory. In 2016, she was Yorkshire's leading run-scorer in the County Championship, with 153 runs including two half-centuries, as well as taking 7 wickets at an average of 12.85. She was again Yorkshire's leading run-scorer in the 2017 Women's County Championship, with 192 runs, including 3 half-centuries. Armitage began captaining Yorkshire in 2016, and captained her first full season in 2019. In 2019, she scored 165 runs in the County Championship, the most for her side. In 2021, she was the side's leading run-scorer and leading wicket-taker in the Twenty20 Cup, with 184 runs and 5 wickets. She was again her side's leading run-scorer in the 2022 Women's Twenty20 Cup, with 214 runs including two half-centuries.

Armitage also played for Yorkshire Diamonds in the Women's Cricket Super League in 2016, 2017 and 2019. Overall, she played 20 matches, scoring 303 runs including one half-century, against Western Storm in 2019.

In November 2019, Armitage was signed by Sydney Sixers for the remainder of the 2019–20 Women's Big Bash League season as a replacement for the injured Ellyse Perry. She played five matches for the side, scoring 54 runs at an average of 10.80. Later that season, she played six matches for Tasmania in the WNCL, scoring 103 runs at an average of 17.16.

In 2020 she joined Northern Diamonds, and was named as captain of the side. She led the side to the final of the Rachael Heyhoe Flint Trophy in their first season, and was the side's second-highest run-scorer, with 176 runs. In 2021, she led the side to the finals of both the Rachael Heyhoe Flint Trophy and the Charlotte Edwards Cup, and was the side's leading run-scorer in the latter tournament. She also played for Northern Superchargers in The Hundred, appearing in three matches. In 2022, she led Northern Diamonds to their first title, winning the Rachael Heyhoe Flint Trophy. She also scored her maiden century, and the highest score across the entire 2022 Rachael Heyhoe Flint Trophy, against Western Storm, scoring 131*. She was also her side's leading run-scorer in the Charlotte Edwards Cup, with 151 runs. She was also ever-present for Northern Superchargers in The Hundred, scoring 119 runs and taking one wicket.

References

External links

 
 

1992 births
Living people
Cricketers from Huddersfield
Yorkshire women cricketers
Yorkshire Diamonds cricketers
Northern Diamonds cricketers
Sydney Sixers (WBBL) cricketers
Tasmanian Tigers (women's cricket) cricketers
Northern Superchargers cricketers